Dhamay is a small village situated in Nakhatrana taluka of Kutch district, in the Indian state of Gujarat. It was established by Hamirji Pachanji Gadhavi (khadiya-charan) in 1904.

References

1904 establishments in India
Bhuj
Villages in Kutch district